Joseph Kibweteere (1932 - disappeared 17 March 2000) was one of the leaders of the Movement for the Restoration of the Ten Commandments of God, a group that splintered from the Catholic Church in Uganda and became infamous after 778 of its members were found dead. Although Kibweteere was assumed to have died in the incident, the Ugandan police shortly afterwards issued a warrant for arrest against the other leaders of the group. In 2014 it was announced by the Uganda National Police that there were reports that Kibweteere was hiding in Malawi.

Biography
Many details of Kibweteere's life, and especially death, remain unclear. What is known is that he came from a strongly pious Catholic background and was likely wealthy by Ugandan standards. He ran for political office in 1980 and owned enough land to donate some land for a school of his own design. The Catholic school he founded and led was apparently orthodox and at that point he had a positive image in the community. In 1960 he married a woman who would prove to outlive him.

During his life, Uganda experienced both religious and political upheaval, which likely influenced him. The strongest of these influences may have been religious movements that emphasized miracles and Marian apparitions. In 1984 he claimed to be experiencing sightings of the Virgin Mary. This vision had been brought to him by Credonia Mwerinde.

Religious acts
Around 1989 he came into contact with a woman named Credonia Mwerinde, a prostitute who claimed she was looking to repent for her sins. She had a background of claimed experiences dating back further than Kibweteere. Credonia claimed that she could see the virgin Mary when looking at a stone in the mountains. The stone apparently bore a strong resemblance to existing depictions of the Virgin Mary. Her father had claimed to have had a vision of his dead daughter, Evangelista, as early as 1960. His children and grandchildren would be affected by this. By 1989, Credonia and her sister, Ursula, were traveling through Uganda spreading the family's message. When Credonia met Kibweteere in the Kanungu District in western Uganda, he welcomed her with open arms and shared his own experiences. This would lead to their forming the Movement for the Restoration of the Ten Commandments of God.

After the death of Credonia's father, Kibweteere became the official leader of the group. In the 1990s the movement strongly emphasized apocalypticism in their booklet A Timely Message from Heaven: The End of the Present Time. Hence, he led an elite circle of six men and six women deemed to be the "new apostles." These apostles had an equal number of women because of the emphasis they placed on Mother Mary as instrumental in sweeping them toward heaven. The group declared several dates upon which the end of the world would arrive; however, several of these dates came and went with no sign of an apocalypse. Reportedly, Kibweteere stated that the year 2000 would be followed by "year 1 of the new world." These and other claims had little effect on the wider world. For the most part, he remained an obscure figure in Uganda and never formally split with the Catholic Church.

Disappearance
In March 2000 the group began slaughtering cattle and buying massive amounts of Coca-Cola. These events did not initially raise alarm, but they were preparation for a feast before death. On March 17, Kibweteere apparently died in the group's mass murder. A member of Kibweteere's family stated that the ostensible leader's actions had been entirely influenced by Credonia Mwerinde.

A great deal remains unclear about his story and about the movement. The BBC reported that Kibweteere had been treated for bipolar disorder a year or so before the group suicide. At that time, the Ugandan authorities considered him a fugitive and mass-murderer because they believed him to have escaped. The date and nature of the apocalypse the group expected has been debated. There is one camp that indicates they believed it would come in 1999 and that the 2000 suicide was caused by the failure of that prophecy. This would seem confirmed by some of their activities of 1999, but, in their literature, 2000 is often seen as the "end year". The nature of his role and significance to the events is also disputed. Due to the circumstances, satisfactory answers to these and other questions may never be forthcoming.

See also
 List of people who disappeared

References

External links
 Seven Years Since the Kanungu Massacre
 Movement for the Restoration of the Ten Commandments of God.
 BBC Report
 ABC Report
 Religious Tolerance.org on the Movement 

1932 births
2000s missing person cases
20th-century apocalypticists
Former Roman Catholics
Founders of new religious movements
Marian visionaries
Missing people
Missing person cases in Uganda
Movement for the Restoration of the Ten Commandments of God
People with bipolar disorder